Uku Hänni (born 27 August 1943, in Kullamaa Parish (now Lääne-Nigula Parish)) is an Estonian astrophysicist and civil servant.

He has been a counsellor in Ministry of Finance's Department of Public Property.

In 2008, he was awarded with Order of the White Star, IV class He is married to astrophysicist Liia Hänni. They have a son, Kristjan.

Works
 Maaerakondade ajaloost Eestis / Eesti Maa-Keskerakond. Compiled by Uku Hänni and Toivo Jullinen. Tartu : Tallinn : Eesti Maa-Keskerakond, 1995

References

1943 births
Living people
People from Lääne-Nigula Parish
Estonian civil servants
Estonian astrophysicists
University of Tartu alumni
Recipients of the Order of the White Star, 4th Class